The Young Democrats of America (YDA) is the youth wing of the Democratic Party of the United States. YDA operates as a separate organization from the Democratic National Committee; following the passage of the Bipartisan Campaign Reform Act, it became an independent 527 organization. The group's membership consists of Democrats from ages 14 to 35, and its political activities include an emphasis on increasing the voter turnout of young people.

Leadership 
YDA membership elects seven national officers on a biennial basis at the organization's National Convention in odd-numbered years and two DNC representatives in even-numbered years. These officers maintain the day-to-day management of the organization. Most recently, officers were elected at the 2021 YDA National Convention in Cincinnati.

Between national conventions, the governing body of YDA is the National Committee which is composed of the president and two national committee representatives from each chartered unit, along with the chairs of the twelve constituency caucuses, eight regional directors, eight chairs of select committees, and the nine individually elected officers.

The President, Democratic National Committeeman, and Democratic National Committeewoman are members of the Democratic National Committee, and superdelegates to any Democratic National Convention occurring during their terms.

2021–2023 National Officers 
President: Quentin Avola Wathum-Ocama of Minnesota
Executive Vice President: Terri Chapman of Alabama
1st Vice President: Kolby Duhon of Texas
2nd Vice President: Nnedi Stephens of Nevada
3rd Vice President: Spencer Dirrig of Ohio
Secretary: Arielle Brandy of Indiana
Treasurer: Mohammed Tazbir Akber Alam, Esq. of New York

2022–2024 Democratic National Committee Members 
Democratic National Committee Representative: Steph Campanha Wheaton of New York
Democratic National Committee Representative: Dunixi Guereca of California

Ex officio National Officers 

 Chair of the Association of Chartered Unit Presidents: Jovan Richards of New York
 Chair of the Council of Region Directors: Christopher Clevenger-Morris of Ohio
 Chair of the Council of Caucus Chairs: Becky Beaver of Georgia

Past leaders 
Democratic party leaders and Democratic elected officials who are former YDA National Officers include:

 U.S. Representative Steny Hoyer
 Former U.S. Senator Warren Magnuson
 Former U.S. Representative Allan Turner Howe
 Former Mayor of Little Rock Mark Stodola
 Former Mayor of New Orleans Chep Morrison
 Former Secretary General Parliamentary Assembly of the Organization for Security and Co-operation in Europe R. Spencer Oliver
 Secretary of State of New Mexico Maggie Toulouse Oliver
 Former Chattanooga City Councilman and Tennessee Democratic Party State Executive Committee Member Chris Anderson
 Former Member of the Texas House of Representatives Lena Guerrero
 Former Member of the Michigan House of Representatives Isaac Robinson
 King County Councilmemeber Joe McDermott

National Convention, National Committee, and chartered units 
The YDA organization is composed of "chartered units" with one from each U.S. state or territory.  YDA holds a National Convention every two years during the summer of odd-numbered years with complex rules for how many votes each chartered unit may cast.  The YDA National Committee meets at least two times per year and consists of the President of each chartered unit, two representatives of differing gender identities from each chartered unit, and a number of other officers and committee and caucus chairs.

National Convention locations 

The 2023 National Convention will take place in Las Vegas, Nevada.
 
Past YDA National Conventions were held in the below venues:
 2021: Cincinnati, OH
 2019: Indianapolis, IN
 2017: Dallas, TX
 2015: Los Angeles, CA
 2013: San Antonio, TX
 2011: Louisville, KY
 2009: Chicago, IL
 2007: Dallas, TX
 2005: San Francisco, CA
 2003: Buffalo, NY
 2001: Tucson, AZ
 1999: Little Rock, AR
 1997: Miami, FL
 1995: New Orleans, LA
 1993: Merrillville, IN
 1991: St Louis, MO
 1989: Columbus, OH
 1987: Phoenix, AZ
 1985: Miami, FL
 1983: Charleston, WV
 1981: Philadelphia, PA

See also 
 College Democrats of America
 High School Democrats of America
 Young Republicans

References

External links 
Young Democrats of America
Past YDA Officers 1967–2015

 
527 organizations
Democratic Party (United States) organizations
Factions in the Democratic Party (United States)
Youth wings of political parties in the United States
Youth wings of liberal parties
Youth-led organizations
1932 establishments in the United States
Political organizations established in 1932